Dominik Josef Peterlini (4 April 1875 – 8 April 1944) was an Austrian musician and choral conductor.

Life 

Born in Vienna, Peterlini came from a family of South Tyrolean manufacturers and was born in the 7th district of Vienna,  6. He grew up in a wealthy family home, his father Andreas Peterlini was a cane and straw chair manufacturer, his mother Katharina (married Brandstetter) traded as a field and straw chair manufacturer. Peterlini received music lessons at an early age, initially violin lessons from his father, later completing his studies with Franz Xaver Haberl and Michael Haller in Regensburg as well as Albanus Schachleiter in Prague. Around 1890, Peterlini founded and conducted a small orchestra with students of the Vienna Conservatory. The Peterlini Boys' Choir, which he founded in 1895, was a boys' choir that later developed into the Vienna Boys' Choir. In 1919, Peterlini built a "rest home" for the Boys' Choir at his country estate in Mauer, Vienna. From 1925 to 1932, Peterlini was a professor at the Vienna Music Academy, during which time he also founded a children's singing school in Mauer.

In 1954, in his honour in the Liesing Mauer district, the Peterlinigasse was named after him; before that, the street was called Draschegasse, which is why it had to be renamed in the course of the redefinition and renumbering of the Liesing municipal district to avoid street name redundancies, as a Draschestraße already existed in the Inzersdorf district. At Westbahnstraße 40 in the district of Neubau, a memorial plaque commemorates Peterlini's work as "director of the choir singing and music school in the Catholic Boys' Association "Maria-Hilf" and founder of the "Peterlini Boys' Choir". There is also a commemorative plaque at Lange Gasse 96 in Mauer, where Peterlini last lived. His estate is in the music collection of the Austrian National Library.

Awards 
 Große Goldene Salvatormedaille der Stadt Wien

References

Further reading 
 Felix Czeike (ed.): Peterlini Dominik Josef. In . Vol. 4, Kremayr & Scheriau, Vienna 1995,  (Numerized).
 
 Uwe Harten/Christian Fastl: Dominik Peterlini. In Oesterreichisches Musiklexikon. Online edition, Vienna 2002 ff., ; Print edition: Vol.4, Österreichischen Akademie der Wissenschaften presses, Vienna 2005, .
 Gudrun Orator: Eine kleine Musikgeschichte des 7. Bezirkes zwischen 1880 und 1920 mit besonderer Berücksichtigung der Rolle des Bürgertums. Diplomarbeit Universität Wien, Wien 2013, pp. 41 ff. (Online-Version)

Austrian choral conductors
1875 births
1944 deaths
Musicians from Vienna
Austro-Hungarian musicians